Henriëtte Tol is a Dutch actress. She is known for her roles as Conny de Graaf in television series Westenwind, Nina Bisschot in Keyzer & De Boer Advocaten and as Karin Alberts in the soap opera Goede tijden, slechte tijden.

She also appeared as Queen Wilhelmina of the Netherlands the musical Soldier of Orange.

References

External links 
 

Living people
Year of birth missing (living people)
Place of birth missing (living people)
20th-century Dutch actresses
21st-century Dutch actresses
Dutch film actresses
Dutch television actresses
Dutch musical theatre actresses